We Still Kill the Old Way is a 1967 Italian crime film directed by Elio Petri. It was entered into the 1967 Cannes Film Festival where it won the award for Best Screenplay. It is based on the novel To Each His Own by Leonardo Sciascia.

Plot
The death threats against the local pharmacist Arturo Manno do not surprise any of his friends because he is a known womanizer in his small town. They do not take his reports of the threats seriously until Manno, together with his friend Dr. Antonio Roscio, are killed while hunting one early morning. Suspicion falls on the father and two brothers of a 16-year-old girl who supposedly had relations with Manno. But Professor Laurana, who had seen one of the extortion letters, does not believe in the guilt of these illiterates from a rundown neighborhood since the letters of the anonymous notes have been made with clippings from the Osservatore Romano - a Vatican newspaper with few local subscribers.

He asks his lawyer friend Rosello to take care of the prisoners, and begins his own research, also motivated by his secret love for Luisa Roscio, the widow of one of the murdered men. His trail leads him to Palermo, but he realizes that Luisa Roscio does not reciprocate his feelings and that his detective work is not delivering results. Shortly after his rejection by Luisa, he is murdered and his body disappears. Life in his native village continues unchanged, partly maintained through the close link between Luisa Roscio and the lawyer Rosello.

Cast
 Gian Maria Volonté as Prof. Paolo Laurana
 Irene Papas as Luisa Roscio
 Gabriele Ferzetti as Avvocato Rosello
 Salvo Randone as Prof. Roscio
 Luigi Pistilli as Arturo Manno
 Laura Nucci as Roscio's mother
 Mario Scaccia as Curato di Sant'Amo
 Luciana Scalise as Rosina
 Leopoldo Trieste as Il deputato comunista
 Giovanni Pallavicino as Ragana
 Franco Tranchina as Dr. Antonio Roscio
 Ana Rivero as Arturo's wife
 Orio Cannarozzo as Ispettore di polizia La Marca
 Carmelo Oliviero as Arciprete Rosello
 Carlo Ferro
 Tanina Zappala
 Valentino Macchi

References

External links

1967 films
1967 crime films
Italian crime drama films
1960s Italian-language films
Films directed by Elio Petri
Films about the Sicilian Mafia
Films based on works by Leonardo Sciascia
Films based on Italian novels
Films scored by Luis Bacalov
Films with screenplays by Ugo Pirro
1960s Italian films